Draginja is a feminine given name. Notable people with the name include:

 Draginja Adamović (1925–2000), Serbian poet
 Draginja Babić (1886-1915), Serbian doctor
 Draginja Vlasic (1928–2011), Serbian painter
 Draginja Vuksanović (born 1978), Montenegrin jurist, politician, and professor

Feminine given names
Serbian feminine given names